Lord Meadowbank can refer to:

 Allan Maconochie, Lord Meadowbank (1748–1816)
 Alexander Maconochie, Lord Meadowbank (1777–1861), his son